Yohann Eudeline (born 23 June 1982) is a French former professional footballer who played as a striker. On 11 May 2019, he was named as director of recruitment of Stade Malherbe Caen.

Personal life
His father Jacques Eudeline played in Ligue 2 for Stade Malherbe Caen.

1982 births
Living people
Footballers from Caen
Association football forwards
French footballers
Ligue 1 players
Ligue 2 players
Stade Malherbe Caen players
En Avant Guingamp players
CS Sedan Ardennes players
FC Nantes players
Angers SCO players